Mildred Griffiths (January 20, 1894 – May 24, 1949) was an American set decorator. She was nominated for an Academy Award in the category Best Art Direction for the film National Velvet.

Selected filmography
 National Velvet (1944)

References

External links

1894 births
1949 deaths
American set decorators
Artists from California